The following highways are numbered 848:

India
 National Highway 848 (India)

United States